This is a list of countries by number of military and paramilitary personnel. It includes any government-sponsored soldiers used to further the domestic and foreign policies of their respective government. The term "country" is used in its most common use, in the sense of state which exercises sovereignty or has limited recognition.

Guide to the list

The list consists of columns that can be sorted by clicking on the appropriate title:
 The names of the states, accompanied by their respective national flags.
 The number of military personnel on active duty that are currently serving full-time in their military capacity.
 The number of military personnel in the reserve forces that are not normally kept under arms, whose role is to be available to mobilize when necessary.
 The number of personnel in paramilitary forces: armed units that are not considered part of a nation's formal military forces.
 The total number of active, reserve, and paramilitary personnel.
 The ratio per thousand inhabitants of total military (active, reserve, and paramilitary).
 The ratio per thousand inhabitants of active military only.

As military forces around the world are constantly changing in size, no definitive list can ever be compiled.

All of the 172 countries listed here, especially those with the highest number of total soldiers such as the two Koreas and Vietnam, include a large number of paramilitaries, civilians and policemen in their reserve personnel. Some countries, such as Italy and Japan, have only volunteers in their armed forces. Other countries, such as Mauritius and Panama, have no national armies, but only a paramilitary force.

Tooth-to-tail ratio

The numbers of military personnel listed include both support personnel (supplies, construction, and contracting) and actual combat personnel. For a typical country, the proportion of this total that comprises actual combat forces is about 26% (so, for every soldier there will be around three support personnel). This proportion is referred to as the "tooth-to-tail ratio".

Some countries have a considerably smaller tooth-to-tail ratio: For example, the United States Armed Forces has a tooth-to-tail ratio of 17%, meaning that for every combat unit there are around five support units.

List by the International Institute for Strategic Studies

Not included in the list are the militaries of Abkhazia, Andorra, Artsakh, Transnistria, Bhutan, Comoros, Eswatini, Maldives, Monaco, Northern Cyprus, Sahrawi, San Marino, Saint Kitts and Nevis, São Tomé and Príncipe, Somaliland, Tonga, Vanuatu, and Vatican City.

See also
List of countries by level of military equipment
List of countries by military expenditures
List of countries by military expenditure per capita
List of countries by Global Militarization Index
List of countries without armed forces
List of militaries by country
List of militaries that recruit foreigners
List of countries that prohibit paramilitary organizations outside government armed forces
List of countries and dependencies by number of police officers

Notes

References

Bibliography

Further reading

Personnel